The following elections occurred in the year 1848.

Africa
 French legislative election in Senegal

Europe
 1848 Belgian general election
 1848 Cisleithanian legislative election
 1848 Danish Constituent Assembly election
 1848 Dutch general election
 France: 
 1848 French Constituent Assembly election
 1848 French presidential election
 German federal election
 1848 Luxembourg general election
 1848 Swiss federal election

North America

Canada
 1848 Newfoundland general election

United States
 1848 New York state election
 1848 and 1849 United States House of Representatives elections
 1848 United States presidential election
 1848 and 1849 United States Senate elections
 see also

See also
 :Category:1848 elections

1848 elections in the United States
1848
Elections